Giuseppe Mariani was an Italian art director. He was nominated for an Academy Award in the category Best Art Direction for the film The Taming of the Shrew.

Filmography

 Scapricciatiello (1955).
 Gladiator of Rome (1962) 
 The Taming of the Shrew (1967)
 Il Conte Max (1991)

References

External links

Italian art directors
Possibly living people
Year of birth missing